Thottappan (transl: Great-grandfather) is a 2019 Malayalam drama film directed by Shanavas K Bavakutty. It depicts the affection between a girl and her godparent.

Plot
When his partner in crime goes missing, a small-time crook dedicates himself to raising the daughter his friend left behind. Two small time thieves jonappan and ithaq shares a special bond and lives by doing crooks as demanded by some people. On a certain endeavour in which ithaque was not present, Jonappan goes missing. After the incident Jonappan's wife remains speechless and behaves insensitively to their daughter Sarah which leads ithaq to take care of her as a father, whom she affectionately calls as 'thottapan'(godfather).The subsequent events in the island after the entrance of a strange youngster leads to a touching climax.

Cast  

Vinayakan as Ithakk
Dileesh Pothan as Jonappan
Priyamvada Krishnan as Sarah
Roshan Mathew as Ismail
Manoj K. Jayan as Fr. Peter
Manju Pathrose as Patricia 
Binoy Nambala as Bernard
Sunitha as Mary
Reghunath Paleri as Adhruman
Manu Jose
Lal

Release 
The Times of India gave the film a rating of three-and-a-half out of five stars and stated that "The well etched out characters and the bittersweet ending does make for a compelling storytelling and an endearing visual experience. And that makes Thottappan a definite treat for a movie enthusiast". The Hindu wrote that "Thottappan builds up slowly, drawing you in with the promise of a knockout punch which never comes. Maybe that's how they intended it to be".

References

External links

2019 drama films